The 2012 FIA WTCC Race of Spain was the second round of the 2012 World Touring Car Championship season and the eighth running of the FIA WTCC Race of Spain . It was held on 1 April 2012 at the Circuit Ricardo Tormo in Valencia, Spain. Chevrolet driver Yvan Muller took pole position for the first race, with Wiechers-Sport's Stefano D'Aste on pole for the second race after the top ten qualifiers were reversed. Both races were won by Chevrolet with Muller winning race one and Alain Menu winning race two.

Background
After the opening round in Italy, Muller was leading the drivers' championship. D'Aste was leading the Yokohama Independents' Trophy.

A continued shortage of the new for 2012 SEAT 1.6T engine meant the cars run by SUNRED Engineering switched to the SUNRED 1.6T engine prior to the Race of Spain. Tiago Monteiro and Andrea Barlesi would switch to the engine and they were joined by series debutant Fernando Monje. Monje joined the championship, having competed in the supporting European Touring Car Cup at Monza. Tom Boardman returned to the championship having been forced to sit out the opening round. With no SEAT 1.6T engine available for him, he took part in the event using the TDI engine.

Report

Free practice
Muller led the opening practice session on Saturday morning with Robert Huff second and Menu third. Pepe Oriola was the fastest SEAT León WTCC while Monteiro was the fastest of the three SUNRED engined cars.

Gabriele Tarquini went quickest in the second free practice session in his Lukoil Racing Team SEAT. ROAL Motorsport driver Tom Coronel had set the pace for much of the session until his time was beaten by Huff and then Tarquini in the final five minutes of the session. Charles Ng was given a black flag after getting stuck in a gravel trap on his first flying lap and then continuing in the session after receiving outside help. Six drivers were warned for cutting the apex at the first corner.

Qualifying
Muller secured his first pole position of the year in qualifying ahead of Tarquini and Coronel. Oriola took the independents' pole with fourth place. Tarquini had been fastest in the first part of qualifying but Muller had been close to going out in the first element of qualifying. Muller had his best time removed for running too wide but he ended the session eighth after a last minute flying lap. By finishing tenth in second qualifying, D'Aste secured the pole position on the reversed grid in race two. The session was not stopped at any time but after the session, the Lukoil Racing car of Aleksei Dudukalo caught fire in Parc Ferme.

Warm-Up
Huff led the warm up session on Sunday morning with pole sitter Muller second fastest.

Race One
Muller led from start to finish to secure his third straight victory of the year. Tarquini had got a better launch from the rolling start but Muller was able to defend and from then on Tarquini's main threat was from Coronel behind. Coronel had received a black and white driving standards flag for making contact with Tarquini but continued on to the final podium spot. Huff and Menu climbed up to fourth and fifth respectively at the expense of Oriola, but sixth place was still enough to secure the independents' victory for Oriola. Monteiro was able to finish in the top ten in his SUNRED-powered car while the only car that failed to finish was Dudukalo.

Race Two
Menu ended Muller's winning streak in race two by coming home ahead of Coronel and D'Aste. Wiechers-Sport driver D'Aste had led until lap seven when he ran wide and handed the lead to Menu. Both Menu and D'Aste then hit oil two laps later sending them across the gravel at turn ten and promoting Coronel to second. Coronel battled with Menu for the lead in the final laps but held on to take the win by less than a second. Menu's Chevrolet was followed home by four BMW 320 TCs as Norbert Michelisz and Franz Engstler followed Coronel and D'Aste.

Results

Qualifying

Bold denotes Pole position for second race.

Race 1

Bold denotes Fastest lap.

Race 2

Bold denotes Fastest lap.

Standings after the round

Drivers' Championship standings

Yokohama Independents' Trophy standings

Manufacturers' Championship standings

 Note: Only the top five positions are included for both sets of drivers' standings.

References

External links
Results Booklet PDF at FIAWTCC.com
Valencia Race Report PDF at FIAWTCC.com

Spain
FIA WTCC Race of Spain